Sara Call (born 16 July 1977) is a Swedish former football defender who played for the Sweden women's national football team. She represented Sweden at the 2003 FIFA Women's World Cup qualification at the 2000 Summer Olympics.

References

External links
 

1977 births
Living people
Swedish women's footballers
Place of birth missing (living people)
Women's association football defenders
Sweden women's international footballers
2003 FIFA Women's World Cup players